Argentine singer Emilia has released one studio album, one live album, twenty singles as a lead artist and two singles as a featured artist and one promotional single. Before launching her solo career, Emilia had been the lead singer of the cumbia-pop band Rombai from 2016 to 2018. Her debut single, "Recalienta", was released in 2019 and peaked at number 68 on the Billboard Argentina Hot 100. Emilia went on to release more singles until she made her breakthrough in 2021 with "Como si no importara", which peaked at number three on the Argentina Hot 100. The follow-up singles "Rápido lento", "De enero a diciembre", "BB" and "Cuatro veinte" were also a success in Argentina, with all of them entering the chart's top ten. "Cuatro veinte" peaked at number two, becoming the first song by a female solo artist to reach such a high position. In May 2022, Emilia announced her debut studio album, ¿Tú crees en mí?, scheduled to be released on May 31, 2022.

Albums

Studio albums

Live albums

Singles

As lead artist

As featured artist and duets

Promotional singles

Other appearances

Notes

References 

Pop music discographies
Discographies of Argentine artists
Latin pop music discographies